Magsaysay, officially the Municipality of Magsaysay,  is a 5th class municipality in the province of Palawan, Philippines. According to the 2020 census, it has a population of 12,603 people.

It is the easternmost of the three municipalities of the Cuyo Archipelago, and its territory includes the eastern half of Cuyo Island, as well as Alcoba, Canipo, Cocoro, Patunga, Paya, Putic, Siparay, Tacbubuc, and Tagauanian islands.

Geography

Barangays
Magsaysay is politically subdivided into 11 barangays.
 Alcoba
 Balaguen
 Canipo
 Cocoro
 Danawan (Poblacion)
 Emilod
 Igabas
 Lacaren
 Los Angeles
 Lucbuan – one of the oldest barangays in Magsaysay. The Saint Michael Archangel Parish Church, where the town fiesta is celebrated, and Cuyo Airport are both located in Lucbuan.
 Rizal

Climate

Demographics

Economy

History

Spanish Era 
The modern-day municipality traces back its origins to the town of Cuyo, its mother town. Cuyo, which included the entire island of Cuyo, was founded as a Spanish settlement in 1622.

In 1762 one of the British ships that invaded Manila fired at the Cuyo fort but it was not damaged at all. Another fort was started at Lucbuan seven kilometres away on the east side of Cuyo island, but it was never finished.

Lucbuan Republic 

The Revolutionary Dictatorial Government of Lucbuan, often referred to as the “Lucbuan Republic” was a state on the island of Cuyo (now Magsaysay, Palawan) that briefly existed during the Philippine-American War. It was established to break away from the administration of President Emilio Aguinaldo and his central administration.

Even before the establishment of the Republic of Lucbuan, Don Casiano Padon, a native of Molo, Iloilo, began organizing a government in August 1898 due to the persuasion of the people of Lucbuan.

After the arrival of the representative of the Province of Calamianes from Bulacan in the last days of 1898, there was not much change in leadership in the entire archipelago of Cuyo and Palawan. This affected the livelihood of the people of Lucbuan as well as the inability to rule by the rulers of Calamianes. By this time the Spaniards had fled throughout Palawan to Borneo to return to Spain.

Very few knew Aguinaldo, and that is why the people of Lucbuan did not like to be ruled by Tagalog representatives under Aguinaldo which was the reason the Republic of Lucbuan was founded by Don Casiano Padon on 30 May 1899 and he himself as Governor of the government.

All went well for the government until Padon decided to build a church which was strongly opposed by the legislature and the people. Thus, Padon and his family fled back to Iloilo and thus for the second time the attempt to join the state and the church was frustrated.

American Era 
This republic was not long in coming when the Province of Calamianes was organized by the Americans on 23 June 1902 under “Philippine Commission Act 422”. This was also accompanied by the conquest of the island of Lucbuan by American soldiers. This is also when the Lucbuan Republic ended.

A marker of Don Casiano Padon currently exists on the municipality of Magsaysay in commemoration of the foundation of the Lucbuan Republic.

Modern Era 
Lucbuan remained a part of Cuyo until 1963 when it became a separate municipality renamed as Magsaysay.

References

External links
Magsaysay Profile at PhilAtlas.com
[ Philippine Standard Geographic Code]
Philippine Census Information
Local Governance Performance Management System

Municipalities of Palawan